Sinbad the Sailor, Sinbad, Sindbad, is a fictional mariner and the hero hailing from Baghdad of the early Abbasid Caliphate (8th–9th centuries A.D.), whose adventures appeared in the One Thousand and One Nights.

Sinbad may also refer to:

Places
 41488 Sindbad, an asteroid

People
 Sinbad (comedian)
 Sunpadh or Sinbad the Magus (fl. 8th century), Iranian religious leader and activist

Arts, entertainment, and media

Fictional characters
Sinbad the Sailor, an alias of Edmond Dantes from The Count of Monte Cristo
Thomas 'Sinbad' Sweeney, a character in Brookside
Sinbad, a character from the Japanese manga/anime, Magi; and the main character in Magi: Adventure of Sinbad, loosely based on the original character

Films
 Sinbad the Sailor (1935 film)
 Sinbad the Sailor (1947 film), starring Douglas Fairbanks Jr
 Sinbad (1992), a Japanese animated film
 Sinbad: Legend of the Seven Seas (2003)
 Sinbad (2015-2016), a Japanese animated film trilogy

Television
 Sinbad (TV series), a 2012 UK television series
 "Sinbad", a season 1 episode of The Eric Andre Show

Theater
Sinbad (1891 musical)
Sinbad (1918 musical)

Other uses
 Sinbad (dog) (1937-1951), a dog formally enlisted into the United States Coast Guard, that held the rank of Chief Dog, equivalent to Chief Petty Officer
 MV Sinbad or HMS Audacity
 Sinbad (album), 1976 jazz album by Weldon Irvine

See also 
 Simbad (disambiguation)
 Sindbad-Nameh
 Szindbád, a 1971 Hungarian film by Zoltán Huszárik